Benjamin Joseph Steele (born May 27, 1978) is a former tight end and  coach in the National Football League (NFL). He is the tight ends coach for the Arizona Cardinals. He coached the tight ends for the Atlanta Falcons, was an assistant offensive line coach for the Denver Broncos, and he formerly played for the Green Bay Packers.  Steele played collegiate ball at Fort Lewis College and Mesa State College.

Playing career
Steele played professionally from 2001-2007 after coming into the NFL as an undrafted free agent. He spent his career with the San Francisco 49ers, Oakland Raiders, Minnesota Vikings, Seattle Seahawks, Green Bay Packers, and the Houston Texans. He played only with the Packers during a regular season, catching four passes in 15 games in 2004 and no passes in two games in 2005.

Coaching career
Steele joined the Atlanta Falcons as an offensive assistant in 2019 after spending the previous five seasons with the Tampa Bay Buccaneers. From 2017–2018, Steele was the Buccaneers' tight ends coach. 
On February 5, 2020 Steele was promoted by the Falcons becoming their tight ends coach.
After being hired to be an analyst for Auburn, on July 23rd, 2021, Steele was instead hired to be the assistant offensive line coach for the Minnesota Vikings.

References

External links
 Auburn Tigers bio

1978 births
Living people
Sportspeople from Denver
Players of American football from Denver
Coaches of American football from Colorado
American football tight ends
Fort Lewis College alumni
Colorado Mesa Mavericks football players
San Francisco 49ers players
Oakland Raiders players
Seattle Seahawks players
Minnesota Vikings players
Frankfurt Galaxy players
Green Bay Packers players
Houston Texans players
Colorado Buffaloes football coaches
Tampa Bay Buccaneers coaches
Atlanta Falcons coaches
Auburn Tigers football coaches
Denver Broncos coaches